Baisha is a town of Shiqian County, Guizhou, China. , it has 23 villages under its administration.

References

Towns in Guizhou
Shiqian County